Paramecium woodruffi is a species of unicellular organisms belonging to the genus Paramecium of the phylum Ciliophora. It was first isolated in 1928 by D. H. Wenrich. It is a member of the Paramecium aurelia species complex.

References

Ciliates